The Timothy M. Younglove Octagon House  built in 1859 is an historic octagonal house located at 8329 Pleasant Valley Road in the town of Urbana near Hammondsport, New York. It was built by land surveyor Timothy Meigs Younglove, who surveyed Hammondport when it was incorporated.

In 2002, it was added to the National Register of Historic Places.  It is now the Black Sheep Inn.

References

Houses on the National Register of Historic Places in New York (state)
Octagon houses in New York (state)
Houses completed in 1859
Houses in Steuben County, New York
National Register of Historic Places in Steuben County, New York

https://www.stayblacksheepinn.com/